Sperry Marshall (19 December 1930 – 1 February 2002) was an Australian sports shooter. He competed in the trap event at the 1972 Summer Olympics.

References

1930 births
2002 deaths
Australian male sport shooters
Olympic shooters of Australia
Shooters at the 1972 Summer Olympics
Place of birth missing